Benares Shoals, or Benares Shoal, is a submerged coral reef, an isolated patch located at , just  west-northwest of Île Pierre, the closest island of Peros Banhos atoll in the northern Chagos Archipelago.

The Benares Shoals were first surveyed in 1837 by Commander Robert Moresby of the Indian Navy on HMS Benares. Moresby's survey produced the first detailed map of this submerged reef, which was subsequently named after his ship.

See also
 List of reefs

References

External links
Indian Ocean Pilot

Chagos Archipelago
Coral reefs